Juho Benjamin (Penna) Paunu (5 October 1868 in Messukylä – 24 August 1920; surname until 1906 Bastman) was a Finnish cooperative manager and politician. He was a member of the Parliament of Finland from 1907 to 1909, from 1911 to 1916 and from 1919 until his death in 1920, representing the Social Democratic Party of Finland (SDP).

References

1868 births
1920 deaths
Politicians from Tampere
People from Häme Province (Grand Duchy of Finland)
Social Democratic Party of Finland politicians
Members of the Parliament of Finland (1907–08)
Members of the Parliament of Finland (1908–09)
Members of the Parliament of Finland (1911–13)
Members of the Parliament of Finland (1913–16)
Members of the Parliament of Finland (1919–22)